In the 2015 President's Cup men's doubles, Sergei Bubka and Marco Chiudinelli were the defending champions, but they did not participate this year.

Konstantin Kravchuk and Denys Molchanov won the tournament, defeating Chung Yun-seong and Jurabek Karimov in the final.

Seeds

Draw

External links
 Main Draw

President's Cup (tennis) - Men's Doubles
2015 Men's Doubles